Robati Gharbatha (also Romanized as Robāţī Gharbathā; also known as Robāţī, Ribāti, Robāţ-e Sar Pāshīdeh, Robāţī Shāhzādeh, Robāţī-ye Balūchhā, Robāţī-ye Sāzdeh, Robāţī-ye Shāhzādeh, and Robāţī-ye Shāzdeh) is a village in Firuzeh Rural District, in the Central District of Firuzeh County, Razavi Khorasan Province, Iran. At the 2006 census, its population was 22, in 5 families.

References 

Populated places in Firuzeh County